Cora smaragdina is a species of basidiolichen in the family Hygrophoraceae. Found in southern Costa Rica, it was formally described as a new species in 2016 by Robert Lücking, Gary Rivas-Plata, and José Luis Chaves. The specific epithet smaragdina refers to the emerald-green colour of the fresh lobes. The lichen occurs in tropical mountainous rainforest, where it grows as an epiphyte on tree bark.

References

smaragdina
Lichen species
Lichens described in 2016
Lichens of Central America
Taxa named by Robert Lücking
Basidiolichens